American musical duo Twenty One Pilots have released six studio albums, three live albums, 10 extended plays, 28 singles and 33 music videos. The band was formed in 2009 and currently consists of Tyler Joseph and Josh Dun. After two self-released albums, Twenty One Pilots in 2009 and Regional at Best in 2011, they were signed by Fueled by Ramen in 2012, which released their following studio albums, as well as Blurryface Live, a three-LP, tri-gatefold picture disc vinyl, and Scaled and Icy (Livestream Version).

The duo achieved breakthrough success with their fourth album Blurryface in 2015, which produced the successful singles "Stressed Out" and "Ride". In addition, the single "Heathens", recorded for the soundtrack of the film Suicide Squad, made the group the first alternative artist to have two concurrent top ten singles in the United States.

The duo's fifth studio album, Trench, was released on October 5, 2018, followed by their sixth, Scaled and Icy, on May 21, 2021. They are the first and currently only artist in history to have each song from two separate studio albums (Vessel and Blurryface) certified at least gold by the RIAA. They have won a Grammy Award for Best Pop Duo/Group Performance, and frontman Tyler Joseph has been nominated for six Grammy Awards in total.

Studio albums

Extended plays

Live albums

Compilation releases

Singles

Promotional singles

Other charted and certified songs

Other songs released by Twenty One Pilots

Music videos

See also
 List of songs recorded by Twenty One Pilots
 Tyler Joseph discography

Notes

References

Discographies of American artists
Discography